Senator Mayne may refer to:

Ed Mayne (1945–2007), Utah State Senate
Karen Mayne (fl. 2000s–2010s), Utah State Senate